The Qajar Palace (Persian: قصر قاجار, romanized: Qasr-e Qajar) was the name of a palace in Tehran, Iran. It was destroyed in 1920s and was replaced by the Qasr prison. The only remaining section is a small pavilion.

It had four watchtowers in corners and didn't have windows on the outside, making it look more like a barracks than a palace.

History 
The palace was created in the second year of the reign of Fathali Shah Qajar but fell out of use after his death. it was then used for military purposes during the reign of Nasereddin Shah Qajar. At last it was demolished and replaced by the Qasr prison during the rule of Reza Shah, which became the first modern prison in Iran.

The palace was featured in the paintings of Eugène Flandin and Pascal Coste, two Frenchmen who travelled to Iran during the reign of Mohammad Shah Qajar.

The prison that replaced it became a museum in 2011

References 

Palaces in Tehran
Buildings of the Qajar period
1920s disestablishments in Iran